In the 2012–13 season, Al Shorta won both the 2012–13 Iraqi Elite League and the Baghdad Cup.

Al Shorta won the Iraqi Premier League (known as the Iraqi Elite League at the time) on the last day of an historic season, thrashing Al Talaba 3–0 to ensure that they clinched the title for the first time since the 1997–98 season and finished two points ahead of second-placed Arbil, losing just two games in the entire season. Al Shorta also triumphed in the Baghdad Cup, with a 1–0 win over rivals Al Zawraa. Hussein Karim scored the winning goal in the match.

The season witnessed Al Shorta sign their first ever foreign players. Cameroonian defender Innocent Awoa was the first to join, and he became a key player for Al Shorta, scoring a goal on the opening day of the season. Sékou Tidiane Souaré, an Ivorian defender, joined the club soon after Innocent Awoa's arrival, however he left the club without playing a single game due to homesickness. Cameroon international striker Jean Michel N'Lend signed a contract with the club at the start of the season and he bagged six goals during his spell at the club, including an historic hat-trick against rivals Al Quwa Al Jawiya. He became the first ever non-Iraqi to score a hat-trick in an Iraqi Premier League match and he left the club in May 2013. Nigerian striker Minusu Buba joined the club on loan a few games into the season and became a star striker, scoring eight goals including a goal in the final match of the season (the 3–0 victory over Al Talaba). Defender Paul Koulibaly, a Burkina Faso regular, joined in the winter transfer window and he provided solidity and experience to the league's second-best defence (only Baghdad FC conceded fewer goals than Al Shorta in the season).

Many of these signings were orchestrated by Al Shorta's Iraqi manager Thair Jassam, who joined the club at the very beginning of the season. He led the team to a league and cup double, cementing his place as a legend for the club.

Al Shorta's league top scorer was Iraqi forward Amjad Kalaf for the third season in a row; this time he netted nine goals.

Squad

 (on loan from El Gouna FC)

Out on loan

 (at Al Talaba until the end of the 2012-13 season)
 (at Zakho FC until the end of the 2012-13 season)
 (at Sulaymaniya FC until the end of the 2012-13 season)

Departed during season

Kit

Transfers

In

Out

Iraqi Elite League

Matches

Score overview

Note: Al Shorta goals listed first.

Classification

Results summary

Results by round

Baghdad Cup

Player statistics

Iraqi Elite League

Baghdad Cup

References

External links
 Al Shorta website
 Al Shorta TV
 Team info at goalzz.com
 2012-13 Season Review from Al Shorta website

Al-Shorta SC seasons
Al Shorta